German submarine U-352 was a Type VIIC U-boat of Nazi Germany's Kriegsmarine during World War II. The submarine was laid down on 11 March 1940, at the Flensburger Schiffbau-Gesellschaft yard at Flensburg, launched on 7 May 1941, and commissioned on 28 August 1941, under the command of Kapitänleutnant Hellmut Rathke. She was part of the 3rd U-boat Flotilla, and was ready for front-line service by 1 January 1942.

Design
German Type VIIC submarines were preceded by the shorter Type VIIB submarines. U-352 had a displacement of  when at the surface and  while submerged. She had two shafts and two  propellers.

U-352 was fitted with five  torpedo tubes (four fitted at the bow and one at the stern), fourteen torpedoes, one  SK C/35 naval gun, 220 rounds, and a  C/30 anti-aircraft gun. The boat had a complement of between forty-four and sixty.

Service history

First patrol
U-352 left Kiel on 15 January 1942, and arrived at Bergen, in Norway, on 19 January. She left the next day and patrolled south of Iceland, without success, before sailing to her new home port at Saint-Nazaire, in France, by 26 February.

Second patrol
U-352 left St. Nazaire, on 7 April 1942, and sailed across the Atlantic to the north-eastern coast of the United States. There on 9 May 1942, she was sunk by depth charges from the U.S. Coast Guard cutter , south of Morehead City, North Carolina, in position . Icarus machine gunned the German submarine when it surfaced, preventing the German crew from manning the deck guns. One survivor reported in 1999, that Icarus departed and then returned 45 minutes later to pick up survivors. Fifteen of the crew were lost, but 33 survived and spent the remainder of the war as prisoners.

Wolfpacks
U-352 took part in one wolfpack, namely:
 Hecht (27 January – 4 February 1942)

Dive site

The wreck scatter is within a  radius of location above on a sand bottom. This wreck has become an artificial reef that is heavily populated with Hemanthias vivanus. The site was listed on the National Register of Historic Places in 2015. It is a popular scuba diving spot for advanced divers. A replica of the wreck is on display at the North Carolina Aquarium at Pine Knoll Shores.

Heinz Richter
Heinz Karl Richter, a Maschinengefreiter (equivalent of a Fireman 3rd Class) who survived the sinking and now lives in Canada, was interviewed for Discovery Channel's special coverage of U-352. He said that Captain Rathke was obsessed with receiving a Knight's Cross of the Iron Cross medal for sinking 100,000 tonnes-worth of enemy ships. Richter said that the captain's obsession eventually led to recklessness, ultimately resulting in the boat's sinking. Richter also said he was the last man out of the U-boat before it sank; those still on board were already dead, or perished in the boat as it sank.

Survivors

According to documents from the Naval Department, the following are survivors of the sinking:

In media
 "Reunion," a 1992 episode of the PBS television series Return to the Sea, tells the story of the sinking of U-352, includes footage of her wreck and 1992 interviews with crewmen from U-352 and Icarus, and documents a memorial service for the crew of U-352 over the site of her wreck on May 9, 1992, the 50th anniversary of her sinking.

References

Bibliography

External links

 
 History Channel TV Show about U-352
 WWII German UBoats
 "German sub sank near U.S.," The Augusta Chronicle
 U.S. Coast Guard History: U-352
 U.S. National Marine Sanctuaries exploration of U-352
 Return to the Sea Episode 204 "Reunion" at OceanArchives (Fair use policy for video at OceanArchives)

1940 ships
World War II submarines of Germany
German Type VIIC submarines
U-boats commissioned in 1941
U-boats sunk in 1942
U-boats sunk by US warships
U-boats sunk by depth charges
Ships built in Flensburg
Shipwrecks of the Carolina coast
Maritime incidents in May 1942
National Register of Historic Places in Carteret County, North Carolina
Shipwrecks on the National Register of Historic Places in North Carolina
World War II on the National Register of Historic Places